Events from the 1030s in England.

Incumbents
Monarch – Canute (to 12 November 1034), Harold I

Events
 1030
 1031
 King Canute invades Scotland and forces the submission of Malcolm II of Scotland.
 1032
 1033
 1034
 1035
 12 November – King Canute dies and is succeeded by Harold Harefoot as King of England.
 Harold's half-brother Harthacanute claims the throne.
 1036
 Council of Oxford declares Harold regent for Harthacanute.
 Harold seizes the royal treasury from Queen Emma of Normandy.
 c. 5 February – Godwin of Wessex kills Alfred Aetheling when the latter launches an unsuccessful attempt to restore the Anglo-Saxon House of Wessex.
 1037
 Harold recognised as King of England in his own right.
 Harold exiles Emma to Bruges.
 1038
Edsige enthroned as Archbishop of Canterbury.
 1039
 Unsuccessful English invasion of Wales.

Births
 1033
Anselm of Canterbury, Archbishop of Canterbury (died 1109)
 1035
 Hereward the Wake, rebel

Deaths
 1035
 12 November – King Canute the Great (born c. 995, Denmark)
 1036
 c. 5 February – Alfred Aetheling, Anglo-Saxon prince
 1038
 29 October – Aethelnoth, Archbishop of Canterbury

References